Bahar Mazara also spelled as Bahar Majara is a village in Shaheed Bhagat Singh Nagar district of Punjab State, India. The village is administrated by Sarpanch an elected representative of the village.

Demography 
As of 2011, Bahar Mazara has a total number of 260 houses and population of 1165 of which 610 include are males while 555 are females according to the report published by Census India in 2011. The literacy rate of Bahar Mazara is 81.35%, higher than the state average of 75.84%. The population of children under the age of 6 years is 130 which is 11.16% of total population of Bahar Mazara, and child sex ratio is approximately 831 as compared to Punjab state average of 846.

Most of the people are from Schedule Caste which constitutes 58.63% of total population in Bahar Mazara. The town does not have any Schedule Tribe population so far.

As per the report published by Census India in 2011, 358 people were engaged in work activities out of the total population of Bahar Mazara which includes 348 males and 10 females. According to census survey report 2011, 100% workers describe their work as main work and 0% workers are involved in Marginal activity providing livelihood for less than 6 months.

Education 
The village has a Punjabi medium, co-ed upper primary school founded in 1955. The schools provide mid-day meal as per Indian Midday Meal Scheme. The school provide free education to children between the ages of 6 and 14 as per Right of Children to Free and Compulsory Education Act.

Amardeep Singh Shergill Memorial college Mukandpur and Sikh National College Banga are the nearest colleges.

Transport 

See also 
List of villages in India

References

External links 
 Tourism of Punjab 
 Census of Punjab
 Locality Based PINCode

Villages in Shaheed Bhagat Singh Nagar district